Hot Apple Pie is the only studio album by American country music band Hot Apple Pie.  It was released June 28, 2005 on DreamWorks Records Nashville. The tracks "Hillbillies", "We're Makin' Up" and "Easy Does It" were all released as singles, respectively reaching numbers 26, 54, and 50 on the Billboard Hot Country Songs charts.  Due to the dissolution of the DreamWorks label in late 2005, the latter two singles were issued on MCA Nashville. "The Shape I'm In" is a cover of a song originally recorded by The Band, while "We're Makin' Up" was previously recorded by Jeffrey Steele on his 2002 album Somethin' in the Water.

Track listing

Personnel

Hot Apple Pie
Keith Horne – bass guitar, acoustic guitar, background vocals
Trey Landry – drums, percussion
Mark "Sparky" Matejka – banjo, electric guitar, background vocals
Brady Seals – lead vocals, harmonica, accordion, acoustic guitar, keyboards

Additional musicians
Dan Dugmore – steel guitar
Paul Franklin – steel guitar
Nashville String Machine – string section
Carl Gorodetzky – concert master
Jim Gray – string arrangements

Chart performance

2005 debut albums
DreamWorks Records albums
Hot Apple Pie albums
Albums produced by Richard Landis